Oedipina stuarti, commonly known as Stuart's worm salamander, is a species of salamander in the family Plethodontidae.
It is endemic to Honduras.

Its natural habitats are tropical dry forests, subterranean habitats (other than caves), and man-made karsts.

References

Sources
 Cruz, G., Wilson, L.D. & McCranie, R. 2004.  Oedipina stuarti.   2006 IUCN Red List of Threatened Species.   Downloaded on 23 July 2007.

Oedipina
Amphibians of Honduras
Endemic fauna of Honduras
Taxonomy articles created by Polbot
Amphibians described in 1968